Ronald MacDonald may refer to:

 Ronald MacDonald (athlete) (1874–1947), Canadian runner
 Ronald MacDonald (bishop) (1835–1912), Canadian Roman Catholic bishop
 Ronald MacDonald (economist) (born 1955), Scottish economist
 Ronald MacDonald (rugby), New Zealand rugby league international and rugby union player
 Ronald St. John Macdonald (1928–2006), Canadian legal academic and jurist
 Ron MacDonald (politician) (born 1955), member of the Canadian House of Commons
 Ronald MacDonald, author, father of Philip MacDonald (1900–1980)
 Ronald Archibald Bosville-Macdonald, 6th Baron Macdonald (1853–1947), 6th Baron Macdonald

See also
 Ranald MacDonald (1824–1894), first man to teach the English language in Japan
 Ronald McDonald (disambiguation)